Grealish is a surname. Notable people with the surname include:

 Jack Grealish (born 1995), English footballer
 Jack Grealish (hurler) (born 1997), Irish hurler 
 Noel Grealish (born 1965), Irish politician
 Tony Grealish (1956–2013), English-born Irish footballer